Logovi'i Mulipola (born 11 March 1987) is a Samoan rugby player currently playing for Newcastle Falcons in Premiership Rugby.

Club career
Mulipola joined Leicester Tigers on trial in November 2011 and made his debut as a replacement on 7 January 2012 against London Wasps in a Premiership game at Welford Road Stadium.  On 11 January 2012 he signed a contract until the end of the 2012 season. Mulipola started the 2012 Anglo-Welsh Cup final as Leicester beat Northampton, he was a used as a 73rd minute replacement in the 2012 Premiership Final where Leicester lost to Harlequins.

For the 2012 ITM Cup, Mulipola signed with Hawke's Bay, for a six-month contract deal. This only became clear to Leicester Tigers after they signed him after his trial with the club.  On 25 April 2012 it was announced Mulipola would not be joining Hawke's Bay and instead signed a new deal with Leicester to keep him in England.

Mulipola started the 2013 Premiership Final at loosehead for Leicester as they beat Northampton to become English champions.  Injury has restricted Mulipola to just 19 starts across three seasons from 2015–18.

On 19 April 2018 it was announced Mulipola had signed for Newcastle Falcons, another Premiership side, for the 2018–19 season.

He joined Gloucester on a short-term deal in July 2020. He returned to Newcastle ahead of the 2020–21 season. He is currently contracted to remain at Newcastle until at least the end of the 2022–23 season.

International career
Mulipola made his debut for  against Papua New Guinea on 18 July 2009 and represented Samoa in the 2011 Rugby World Cup, where he came off the bench for 2 minutes against .

On 23 August 2019, he was named in Samoa's 34-man training squad for the 2019 Rugby World Cup, before being named in the final 31 on 31 August.

International tries

Personal life 

Mulipola has twin sons with the sister of Martin Castrogiovanni.

On 16 February 2018 Mulipola represented Samoa at a reception hosted by Queen Elizabeth II at Buckingham Palace to celebrate the achievements of the Commonwealth diaspora.

References

External links
 http://www.espnscrum.com/scrum/rugby/player/102201.html
 http://www.rwc2011.irb.com/home/teams/team=45/player=36205/index.html
 http://www.leicestertigers.com/rugby/leicester_tigers_senior_squad.php?player=102947&includeref=dynamic
 http://www.leicestertigers.com/

Samoan rugby union players
1987 births
Samoa international rugby union players
Living people
Samoan expatriate rugby union players
Expatriate rugby union players in England
Samoan expatriate sportspeople in England
Leicester Tigers players
Rugby union props
People from Aiga-i-le-Tai